Symplicjusz Zwierzewski (6 December 1903 – 26 December 1986) was a Polish footballer. He played in three matches for the Poland national football team from 1926 to 1936.

References

External links
 

1903 births
1986 deaths
Polish footballers
Poland international footballers
Place of birth missing
Association footballers not categorized by position